Mark Schutte (born 30 December 1991) is an Irish hurler who plays for Dublin Senior Championship club Cuala and at inter-county level with the Dublin senior hurling team. He currently lines out as a forward.

Career

A dual player at club and county levels, Schutte lined out at full-forward when the Cuala club won consecutive All-Ireland Club Championship titles in 2017 and 2018. He has also won two Leinster Club Championship titles and five County Championship titles. At inter-county level, Schutte won Leinster Championship medals in the minor and under-21 grades in both codes before winning an All-Ireland Under-21 Championship with the under-21 footballers. A brief spell with the Dublin senior football team was soon followed by inclusion on the Dublin senior hurling team. Schutte was recalled to the football squad for a further two seasons, winning consecutive All-Ireland Championship titles as a member of the extended panel in 2017 and 2018. He has also won Leinster Championship medals in both codes. His brother, Paul Schutte, has also played for Dublin.

Honours

Cuala
All-Ireland Senior Club Hurling Championship: 2017, 2018
Leinster Senior Club Hurling Championship: 2016, 2017
Dublin Senior Hurling Championship: 2015, 2016, 2017, 2019, 2020

Dublin
All-Ireland Senior Football Championship: 2017, 2018
Leinster Senior Football Championship: 2017, 2018
Leinster Senior Hurling Championship: 2013
All-Ireland Under-21 Football Championship: 2012
Leinster Under-21 Football Championship: 2012
Leinster Under-21 Hurling Championship: 2011
Leinster Minor Football Championship: 2009

References

External link
Mark Schutte profile at the Dublin GAA website

1991 births
Living people
Cuala hurlers
Dublin inter-county hurlers
Dublin inter-county Gaelic footballers
Dual players
Irish accountants